Lindsey Michelle Horan (born May 26, 1994) is an American professional soccer player for Olympique Lyonnais Féminin on loan from Portland Thorns FC. She previously played for the Portland Thorns FC of the National Women's Soccer League (NWSL), the highest division of women's professional soccer in the United States, and the United States women's national soccer team. In 2018, she was named NWSL MVP. Horan was a leading player for the Thorns during their 2017 championship season, scoring the winning goal in the championship game, and before that was a prolific scorer for Paris Saint-Germain FC, scoring 46 goals in 58 appearances.
She was the leading scorer for the United States U-17 team at the 2010 CONCACAF U-17 Women's Championship.

Early life
Horan was born May 26, 1994 and grew up in Golden, Colorado near Denver. Although she attended Golden High School, she did not play soccer for the school. Instead, she played club soccer with the Colorado Rush. She first started playing for the Colorado Edge during the U-11 tryouts. In March, when Horan was 15 years old and was one of the youngest players on the United States under-17 women's national team, she scored 12 goals in nine games (a team best) leading up to the North American/Central American/Caribbean U-17 tournament in Costa Rica. During her sophomore year at Golden, she was named to the Parade Magazine High School All-American team although she didn't play high school soccer.

In 2012, Horan was named the top-ranked college prospect by ESPN. Although she had a scholarship to play for North Carolina, Horan bypassed her college career and signed with French club Paris Saint-Germain FC (PSG).

Club career

Colorado Rush
Horan played for the Colorado Rush in the W-League during the 2012 season. She played three games for the team, scoring two goals and taking 19 shots.

Paris Saint-Germain FC, 2012–2016

In July 2012, Horan signed a six-figure deal to play with the professional French club, Paris Saint-Germain FC (PSG). On January 4, 2016, Paris Saint-Germain announced Horan's contract had been terminated to allow her to return to the United States. She played her final game on December 5, 2015, a 5–0 win over FCF Juvisy. Horan scored the match's opening goal. Horan scored 46 goals in 58 appearances for PSG.

Portland Thorns, 2016–2022

On January 13, 2016, Horan signed with the Portland Thorns FC of the NWSL.

Unlike her role at PSG, Horan for Portland plays in central midfield in a position similar to her national-team role.

Horan scored the only goal in Portland's 1–0 win over the North Carolina Courage in the 2017 NWSL Championship and was named NWSL Championship MVP.

Horan was named Player of the Month for July 2018, she scored three goals in July, helping the Thorns to a 3–0–0 record for the month. She was named to the 2018 NWSL Best XI, and on September 21, 2018 she was named 2018 NWSL Most Valuable Player.

In 2020, she was a key player in helping Thorns win the Fall Series and the associated Community Shield, and in 2021, did the same for the Thorns' winning the NWSL Challenge Cup, the Women's International Champions Cup, and the NWSL Shield.

Olympique Lyonnais Féminin, 2022–present (loan)
On January 27, 2022, Horan joined Lyon on loan.

Club summary

Notes

International career 

Horan played for the United States women's national under-17 soccer team and was the leading scorer for the team at the 2010 CONCACAF Women's U-17 Championship. She helped the United States women's national under-20 soccer team win the 2012 CONCACAF Women's U-20 Championship in March by scoring four goals, including a hat trick against Guatemala in the group stage.  Horan was unable to play in the 2012 FIFA U-20 Women's World Cup because of a knee injury that required surgery.

In February 2013, at the age of eighteen, she was named to the senior team roster for the 2013 Algarve Cup. She earned her first cap for the senior team during a group stage match against China at the Algarve on March 8, 2013. Horan was called up to the senior roster near the end of 2015, and scored her first goal for the senior team during a 'Woman of the Match' performance against Trinidad & Tobago in December 2015.  She is on the roster for the 2016 CONCACAF Women's Olympic Qualifying Championship and started the opening group stage match against Costa Rica in central midfield.

While Horan played successfully as a striker during her time at PSG, with 46 goals in 56 appearances, she played in central midfield after her return to the national team in 2016.

Horan was called up for the 2019 FIFA Women's World Cup, scoring her first World Cup goal in the opening game against Thailand on 11 June. On January 31, 2020, she scored her first career hat-trick against Panama in the 2020 CONCACAF Women's Olympic Qualifying Championship in addition to assisting goals scored by Lynn Williams and Tobin Heath.

On 24 July 2021, Horan played her 100th match for USWNT, and scored a goal in a 6–1 win over New Zealand in the 2020 Summer Olympics.

International summary

Player statistics

Olympic appearances

World Cup Appearances

International goals

Honors and awards
Portland Thorns FC
NWSL Champions: 2017
NWSL Shield: 2016, 2021
 NWSL Community Shield: 2020
 NWSL Challenge Cup: 2021
 Women's International Champions Cup: 2021

Olympique Lyonnais Féminin
UEFA Women's Champions: 2021–22
United States
 FIFA Women's World Cup: 2019
 Olympic Bronze Medal: 2020
 CONCACAF Women's Championship: 2018;  2022
 CONCACAF Women's Olympic Qualifying Tournament: 2016; 2020
 SheBelieves Cup: 2016; 2018; 2020; 2021; 2023
 Tournament of Nations: 2018
United States U20

 CONCACAF Women's U-20 Championship: 2014

Individual
NWSL Second XI: 2017
NWSL Championship MVP: 2017
NWSL Best XI: 2018
NWSL Most Valuable Player: 2018
CONCACAF Women's Olympic Qualifying Tournament Best XI: 2020
US Soccer Female Player of the Year: 2021

References

Match reports

External links

 PSG player profile
 Thorns FC player profile
 

1994 births
Living people
American expatriate sportspeople in France
American women's soccer players
Division 1 Féminine players
Expatriate women's footballers in France
Footballers at the 2016 Summer Olympics
Footballers at the 2020 Summer Olympics
National Women's Soccer League players
Parade High School All-Americans (girls' soccer)
Paris Saint-Germain Féminine players
People from Golden, Colorado
Portland Thorns FC players
Soccer players from Colorado
Sportspeople from the Denver metropolitan area
United States women's international soccer players
United States women's under-20 international soccer players
Women's association football forwards
2019 FIFA Women's World Cup players
FIFA Women's World Cup-winning players
FIFA Century Club
Olympic bronze medalists for the United States in soccer
Medalists at the 2020 Summer Olympics
21st-century American women
20th-century American women